James Albert Archer (31 May 1900 – 15 July 1979) was a New Zealand rugby union player. He was educated at Waimahaka School. A wing forward, Archer represented Southland at a provincial level, and was selected in 1925 for the New Zealand national side, the All Blacks, for their tour of New South Wales. He played two matches for the All Blacks: a warm-up game against Wellington; and then the tour opener against New South Wales, where he suffered a serious knee injury that affected the rest of his rugby career. Archer did not appear in any internationals.

References

1900 births
1979 deaths
Rugby union players from Invercargill
New Zealand rugby union players
New Zealand international rugby union players
Southland rugby union players
Rugby union wing-forwards